Fritz Ferdinand Pleitgen (21 March 1938 – 15 September 2022) was a German television journalist and author. He was correspondent in Moscow, East Berlin and Washington. Pleitgen was a supporter of Willy Brandt's Ostpolitik. In 1988, Pleitgen became editor-in-chief of television of Germany's then-largest public broadcaster, Westdeutscher Rundfunk (WDR), and was director of WDR from 1995 to 2007. He is regarded as one of the most influential German journalists and media makers. In 2010, he was the manager of Ruhr.2010, a project of European Capital of Culture.

Life and career
Pleitgen was born in Duisburg-Meiderich on 21 March 1938, the fifth child of a technical draftsman working at Krupp. He grew up in Bünde in East Westphalia and left high school without completing his programme, because he was already working for the Bünde local editorial office of Bielefeld's  as a sports and court reporter. In 1961, he volunteered to become an editor.

In 1963, Pleitgen began working as a journalist at the German broadcaster WDR; he started as a reporter for Tagesschau. His duties included reporting from Brussels and Paris covering the European Economic Community and NATO. In 1967, he broadcast from the Middle East on the Six-Day War between Israel and its Arab neighbours. From 1970, Pleitgen reported as ARD's foreign correspondent from Moscow, where he accompanied Soviet leader Leonid Brezhnev on trips abroad. Without his own camera crew, he needed approval from the Soviet Foreign Ministry for almost all reports. Under constant KGB surveillance, he was the first Western journalist to have an interview with the General Secretary of the Communist Party. He also established contacts with dissidents like Andrei Sakharov, Lev Kopelev, Yuri Orlov, and Andrei Amalrik. From 1977, Pleitgen served as correspondent in East Berlin, but his work was restricted by the Stasi. His predecessor was expelled from the GDR. Erich Honecker invited Pleitgen to hunt rabbits in 1981, in contrast Pleitgen was also in contact with the dissidents Stefan Heym, and Robert Havemann. From 1982, he reported as ARD studio chief from Washington and New York and excelled in critical reporting on Ronald Reagan. 

In 1988, director of WDR Friedrich Nowottny called Pleitgen back to the parent company in Germany to be editor-in-chief of WDR television in Cologne, and in 1994 he became director of radio. Known for his work during the Cold War, he became the television face of reunification. Pleitgen was director of the WDR from 1995 to 2007, succeeding his former boss Nowottny; from 2001 to 2002, he was chairman of the ARD. His motto was "" (through quality to ratings). He played a key role in the launch of the event and documentary channel Phoenix. One of his tasks was the establishment of regional studios. During his tenure, the surreptitious advertising scandal occurred. From 2006 to 2008, he was head of the European Broadcasting Union.

After leaving WDR in 2007, Pleitgen took over the management of the European Capital of Culture 2010 project in Essen (Ruhr.2010) and officially retired in 2010. He took moral responsibility for the Love Parade disaster.

Considered one of the most influential German journalists and media makers, Pleitgen interviewed Ronald Reagan, Erich Honecker, Egon Krenz, Mikhail Gorbachev, and Helmut Kohl.

Political views
Pleitgen appreciated the value of a free press, because of his own experiences with censorship in totalitarian states. According to Pleitgen, the German broadcaster ARD had features of a state media in the early years, but emancipated later.

Pleitgen was a supporter of Willy Brandt's Ostpolitik and in conflict with the Christian Social Union in Bavaria.

In 2019, he criticised the homogeneous reporting and warned of the decay of democracy. He stated in May 2021, that a concept for a policy with Russia is missing, Russians are Europeans. In March 2022, he admitted to having underestimated the danger posed by Russian President Vladimir Putin.

Activities
 Member of the SPD
 1998–2017 Chairman and 2017–2022 Honorary Chairman of the Board of the Lev Kopelev Forum
 2007 Member of the Board of Trustees of Reporter ohne Grenzen (Reporters Without Borders)
 2010–2021 President of the German Cancer Aid
 2013–2020 Member of the Board of Trustees of the Alfried Krupp von Bohlen und Halbach Foundation

Personal life
In 1969, Pleitgen married Gerda Lichtenberg; the couple had four children. One of his sons is journalist Frederik Pleitgen. 

Pleitgen lived in Bergisch Gladbach. In 2020, he was diagnosed with pancreatic cancer, and died on 15 September 2022 in Cologne at the age of 84.

Works

Awards
 1995: Saure Gurke, mocking award by feminist media professionals
 1999: Närrisches Steckenpferd by Krefeld-based carnival association
 1999:  for professional training
 2003:  by Düsseldorf's Jewish community
 2004: Culture award by Free Masons
 2005: 
 2006: Ambassador for 2006 INAS World Football Championships in Germany
 2006: Honorary doctorate from Dortmund University
 2007:  awarded by German Cultural Council
 2007: Order of Merit of North Rhine-Westphalia
 2007: Willi Ostermann Medal in Gold, the highest Cologne Carnival honour
 2009:  by the Association of German Surveying Engineers
 2012: Commander's Cross of the Order of Merit of the Federal Republic of Germany
 2019: Brost Ruhr Prize

Notes

References

Further reading

External links

 

1938 births
2022 deaths
20th-century German journalists
21st-century German journalists
German male journalists
German television presenters
German television reporters and correspondents
German broadcast news analysts
German male writers
Westdeutscher Rundfunk
Commanders Crosses of the Order of Merit of the Federal Republic of Germany
Members of the Order of Merit of North Rhine-Westphalia
People from Duisburg
ARD (broadcaster) people
Westdeutscher Rundfunk people
Deaths from pancreatic cancer
Deaths from cancer in Germany